Gilang Angga Kusuma is an Indonesian footballer who plays in PSBL. His natural position is a midfielder. He stands at 172 cm.

Persib
He was contracted by Persib in 2002. he successfully became part of the senior squad. He scored his first goal when Persib played against Deltras.

PSBL
He was contracted by PSBL in 2011

References

1980 births
Living people
Indonesian footballers
Persib Bandung players
Liga 1 (Indonesia) players
Sundanese people
Sportspeople from Bandung
Association football wingers
Association football fullbacks